Group B of the 2003 FIFA Women's World Cup was one of four groups of nations, consisting of Brazil, France, Norway and South Korea. It began on September 20 and ended on September 27. Rising power Brazil topped the group, comfortably beating South Korea and Norway by large margins and were denied a 100% record by Marinette Pichon's last minute equalizer against France. Brazil were joined in the second round by Norway, who won their other two games against France and South Korea, both which were making their debut at the World Cup.

Standings

Matches
All times local (EDT/UTC–4)

Norway vs France

Brazil vs South Korea

Norway vs Brazil

France vs South Korea

South Korea vs Norway

France vs Brazil

References

External links
2003 FIFA Women's World Cup Group B

Group
Group
Group
Group
2003 in South Korean football